Elsinora Station most commonly known as Elsinora is a pastoral lease that has operated as both a sheep station and a cattle station in outback New South Wales.

History
The station was established in 1882 by Edward Killen who took up the lease of virgin unimproved and waterless country with boundaries that had not been surveyed.

By 1883 the owners had spent £13,000 on improvements, and by 1888 some 70,000 sheep were depastured at the station.

In 1894 approximately 100,000 sheep were being shorn at Elsinora.

The property was owner by Killen and Co. in 1912, Killen also owned Mooculta Station.

Sidney Kidman acquired the property in 1918 along with Urisino and Thurloo Downs from Goldsbrough Mort & Co and held it until 1923.

See also
 List of ranches and stations

References

Stations (Australian agriculture)
Pastoral leases in New South Wales
1882 establishments in Australia